The 1998 New Orleans Saints season was the team's 32nd as a member of the National Football League (NFL).

The Saints failed to qualify for the playoffs for the sixth consecutive season, and after a promising start of 3–0 only equalled their 6–10 record of the previous season. In the process the Saints lost to the 0–7 Carolina Panthers and were to follow this up the following season against the expansion Browns to become the only team since the NFL/AFL merger to lose to the last winless team in successive seasons.

Offseason

NFL draft

Personnel

Staff

Roster

Schedule 

Note: Intra-division opponents are in bold text.

Standings

References 

New Orleans Saints seasons
New Orleans Saints
New